Sunnyside (formerly, Maltermoro) is a census-designated place in Fresno County, California. It is an eastern suburb of Fresno. At the 2010 census, Sunnyside's population was 4,235.

The Maltermoro post office operated from 1894 to 1913. The name honored postmaster George H. Malter.

Demographics
At the 2010 census Sunnyside had a population of 4,235. The racial makeup of Sunnyside was 2,687 (63.4%) White, 176 (4.2%) African American, 58 (1.4%) Native American, 467 (11.0%) Asian, 6 (0.1%) Pacific Islander, 640 (15.1%) from other races, and 201 (4.7%) from two or more races. Hispanic or Latino of any race were 1,525 persons (36.0%).

The census reported that 4,231 people (99.9% of the population) lived in households, 4 (0.1%) lived in non-institutionalized group quarters, and no one was institutionalized.

There were 1,490 households, 484 (32.5%) had children under the age of 18 living in them, 916 (61.5%) were opposite-sex married couples living together, 154 (10.3%) had a female householder with no husband present, 71 (4.8%) had a male householder with no wife present.  There were 61 (4.1%) unmarried opposite-sex partnerships, and 11 (0.7%) same-sex married couples or partnerships. 294 households (19.7%) were one person and 173 (11.6%) had someone living alone who was 65 or older. The average household size was 2.84.  There were 1,141 families (76.6% of households); the average family size was 3.24.

The age distribution was 981 people (23.2%) under the age of 18, 356 people (8.4%) aged 18 to 24, 861 people (20.3%) aged 25 to 44, 1,190 people (28.1%) aged 45 to 64, and 847 people (20.0%) who were 65 or older.  The median age was 43.1 years. For every 100 females, there were 98.5 males.  For every 100 females age 18 and over, there were 93.2 males.

There were 1,562 housing units at an average density of ,of which 1,490 were occupied, 1,199 (80.5%) by the owners and 291 (19.5%) by renters.  The homeowner vacancy rate was 1.5%; the rental vacancy rate was 5.5%.  3,237 people (76.4% of the population) lived in owner-occupied housing units and 994 people (23.5%) lived in rental housing units.

References

Census-designated places in Fresno County, California
Census-designated places in California